ASU Prep Digital is a public charter university-preparatory school in the Arizona State University Preparatory Academy.

Academics 
ASU Prep Digital is an extension of Arizona State University that offers online courses using a college preparatory curriculum. Eligible students can enroll in college courses at Arizona State University. On August 17, 2020, ASU Prep Digital officially opened K-8 grades.

ASU Prep Digital is accredited by Cognia.

References

External links 
 

Arizona State University
Public high schools in Arizona
Charter schools in Arizona
2017 establishments in Arizona
Educational institutions established in 2017
Schools offering Cambridge International Examinations
Online schools in the United States
Preparatory schools in Arizona